Onomatopoeia refers to a word that imitates or suggests the source of the sound that it describes.

Onomatopoeia may also refer to:

 Onomatopoeia (comics), a villain in Green Arrow and Batman comic books
 Onomatopoeia (album), an album by the band Flobots
 "Onomatopoeia" (song), a song by Todd Rundgren from the album Hermit of Mink Hollow
 "Onomatopoeia" (song), a song by progressive rock band Spock's Beard from the album Feel Euphoria